We Live In Two Worlds is a 1937 filmed talk by British writer J. B. Priestley, in which he expounds on the benefits of cross-border trade and communications, contrasting such commerce  with the military preoccupations of individual nations.
The film was directed by Alberto Cavalcanti, the second of seven that the writer and director made for the Swiss telephone company Pro Telephone Zurich between 1936 and 1939.

References

External links
 
 We Live In Two Worlds at the BFI
 

British short films
British documentary films
1937 documentary films
1937 films
Films directed by Alberto Cavalcanti
Sponsored films
Documentary films about economics
GPO Film Unit films
British black-and-white films
1930s British films